Chile Highway 5 or Route 5 known locally as Ruta 5 is Chile's longest route, . It is part of the Pan-American Highway.

Stretch
It passes through Santiago, the country's capital, where it is called Autopista Central.

Highway grade
The highway ends in Puerto Montt, but it divides in two different routes, one crossing the Chacao Channel that separates Chiloé from the continent and another route named Carretera Austral (Spanish for Southern Highway) that was opened in the 1980s. The southern part of Ruta 5 crosses long extensions of native woods and important cities.

Freeway grade
South of La Serena to Puerto Montt it is a 4 lane divided highway and toll road for the most part. It is Chile's longest freeway.

Tunnels
Each one of them carries two lanes of traffic, except El Melón Tunnel, the only that carries a lane in each direction.

References

Roads in Chile
Transport in Los Lagos Region